The following is a list of Intel Core i7 brand microprocessors. Introduced in 2008, the Core i7 line of microprocessors are intended to be used by high-end users.

Desktop processors

Nehalem microarchitecture (1st generation)

"Bloomfield" (45 nm)

 All models support: MMX, SSE, SSE2, SSE3, SSSE3, SSE4.1, SSE4.2, Enhanced Intel SpeedStep Technology (EIST), Intel 64, XD bit (an NX bit implementation), Intel VT-x, Hyper-threading, Turbo Boost, Smart Cache.
 FSB has been replaced with QPI.
 Transistors: 731 million
 Die size: 263 mm
 Steppings: C0, D0

"Lynnfield" (45 nm) 

 All models support: MMX, SSE, SSE2, SSE3, SSSE3, SSE4.1, SSE4.2, Enhanced Intel SpeedStep Technology (EIST), Intel 64, XD bit (an NX bit implementation), TXT, Intel VT-x, Intel VT-d, Hyper-threading, Turbo Boost, Smart Cache.
 Core i7-875K features an unlocked multiplier and does not support Intel TXT and Intel VT-d.
 FSB has been replaced with DMI.
Moves the QPI link and PCI-Express controller onto the processor itself (eliminating the northbridge), using DMI to interface a single-component "chipset" (now called PCH) that serves traditional southbridge functions.
 Transistors: 774 million
 Die size: 296 mm
 Stepping: B1

Westmere microarchitecture (1st generation)

"Gulftown" (32 nm) 

 All models support: MMX, SSE, SSE2, SSE3, SSSE3, SSE4.1, SSE4.2, Enhanced Intel SpeedStep Technology (EIST), Intel 64, XD bit (an NX bit implementation), Intel VT-x, Hyper-threading, Turbo Boost, AES-NI, Smart Cache.
 Core i7-980X, 990X, and 995X feature an unlocked multiplier.
 FSB has been replaced with QPI.
 Transistors: 1.17 billion
 Die size: 239 mm
 Steppings: B1

Sandy Bridge microarchitecture (2nd generation)

"Sandy Bridge" (32 nm) 
 Most models support: MMX, SSE, SSE2, SSE3, SSSE3, SSE4.1, SSE4.2, AVX, Enhanced Intel SpeedStep Technology (EIST), Intel 64, XD bit (an NX bit implementation), TXT, Intel VT-x, Intel VT-d, Hyper-threading, Turbo Boost, AES-NI, Smart Cache, Intel Insider, vPro
 Support for up to 4 DIMMS of DDR3-1333 memory.
S processors feature lower-than-normal TDP (65 W on 4-core models).
K processors have unlocked turbo multiplier but does not support Intel TXT, Intel VT-d and vPro.
 Non-K processors will have limited turbo overclocking.
 Transistors: 1.16 billion
 Die size: 216 mm

"Sandy Bridge-E" (32 nm) 

 All models support: MMX, SSE, SSE2, SSE3, SSSE3, SSE4.1, SSE4.2, AVX, Enhanced Intel SpeedStep Technology (EIST), Intel 64, XD bit (an NX bit implementation), Intel VT-x, Intel VT-d, Hyper-threading, Turbo Boost, AES-NI, Smart Cache.
 Support for up to 8 DIMMS of DDR3-1600 memory.
 Transistors: 1.27 (M1 stepping) or 2.27 (C1, C2 steppings) billion
 Die size: 294 (M1 stepping) or 435 (C1, C2 steppings) mm

Ivy Bridge microarchitecture (3rd generation)

"Ivy Bridge" (22 nm) 

 All models support: MMX, SSE, SSE2, SSE3, SSSE3, SSE4.1, SSE4.2, AVX, F16C, Enhanced Intel SpeedStep Technology (EIST), Intel 64, XD bit (an NX bit implementation), Intel VT-x, Hyper-threading, Turbo Boost 2.0, AES-NI, Smart Cache, Intel Insider
 Support for up to 4 DIMMS of DDR3-1600 memory.
 All models except the K processors additionally support Intel TXT, Intel VT-d and vPro.
S processors feature lower-than-normal TDP (65 W on 4-core models).
T processors are power optimized
K processors have unlocked turbo multiplier but do not support Intel TXT, Intel VT-d or vPro. Non-K processors will have limited turbo overclocking.
 Transistors: 1.4 billion
 Die size: 160 mm

"Ivy Bridge-E" (22 nm) 

 All models support: MMX, SSE, SSE2, SSE3, SSSE3, SSE4.1, SSE4.2, AVX, F16C, Enhanced Intel SpeedStep Technology (EIST), Intel 64, XD bit (an NX bit implementation), Intel VT-x, Intel VT-d, Hyper-threading, Turbo Boost 2.0, AES-NI, Smart Cache.
 Support for up to 8 DIMMS of DDR3-1866 memory.
 Transistors: 1.86 billion
 Die size: 256.5 mm

Haswell microarchitecture (4th generation)

"Haswell-DT" (quad-core, 22 nm) 

 All models support: MMX, SSE, SSE2, SSE3, SSSE3, SSE4.1, SSE4.2, AVX, AVX2, FMA3, F16C, (BMI1)(Bit Manipulation Instructions1)+BMI2, Enhanced Intel SpeedStep Technology (EIST), Intel 64, XD bit (an NX bit implementation), Intel VT-x, Hyper-threading, Turbo Boost 2.0, AES-NI, Smart Cache, Intel Insider
 All models except the i7-4770K additionally supported Intel TSX-NI at launch, but support was disabled in later stepping and microcode updates, due to the incorrect implementation, that could not be solved by microcode without hurting performance or fixing it fully.
 All models except the i7-4770K additionally support Intel VT-d
 All models except the i7-4770K and i7-4790K additionally support vPro and TXT
 Transistors: 1.4 billion
 Die size: 177 mm

"Haswell-H" (MCP, quad-core, 22 nm) 

 All models support: MMX, SSE, SSE2, SSE3, SSSE3, SSE4.1, SSE4.2, AVX, AVX2, FMA3, F16C, (BMI1)(Bit Manipulation Instructions1)+BMI2, Enhanced Intel SpeedStep Technology (EIST), Intel 64, XD bit (an NX bit implementation), Intel VT-x, Intel VT-d, Hyper-threading, Turbo Boost 2.0, AES-NI, Smart Cache, Intel Insider.
i7-4770R does not support TSX, TXT and Vpro.
 Core i7-4770R also contains "Crystalwell": 128 MB eDRAM built at 22 nm acting as L4 cache
 Transistors: 1.4 billion
 Die size: 264 mm + 84 mm

"Haswell-E" (22 nm) 

 All models support: MMX, SSE, SSE2, SSE3, SSSE3, SSE4.1, SSE4.2, AVX, AVX2, FMA3, F16C, Enhanced Intel SpeedStep Technology (EIST), Intel 64, XD bit (an NX bit implementation), Intel VT-x, Intel VT-d, Hyper-threading, Turbo Boost 2.0, AES-NI, Smart Cache.
 Support for up to 8 DIMMS of DDR4-2133 memory.
 Transistors: 2.60 billion
 Die size: 356 mm
 i7-5820K has 28 PCI Express lanes; i7-5930K and i7-5960X have 40

Broadwell microarchitecture (5th generation)

"Broadwell-H" (quad-core, 14 nm) 

 All models support: MMX, SSE, SSE2, SSE3, SSSE3, SSE4.1, SSE4.2, AVX, AVX2, FMA3, F16C, (BMI1)(Bit Manipulation Instructions1)+BMI2, Enhanced Intel SpeedStep Technology (EIST), Intel 64, XD bit (an NX bit implementation), Intel VT-x, Intel VT-d, Hyper-threading, Turbo Boost 2.0, AES-NI, Smart Cache, Intel Insider, Intel TSX-NI
 All models also contain "Crystal Well": 128 MB eDRAM acting as L4 cache
 Transistors: 
 Die size: 166mm
 PCI Express lanes: 16

"Broadwell-E" (14 nm) 

 All models support: MMX, SSE, SSE2, SSE3, SSSE3, SSE4.1, SSE4.2, AVX, AVX2, FMA3, F16C, Enhanced Intel SpeedStep Technology (EIST), Intel 64, XD bit (an NX bit implementation), Intel VT-x, Intel VT-d, Hyper-threading, Turbo Boost 3.0, AES-NI, Smart Cache.
 Does not support Intel TSX-NI (disabled using microcode update, due to the hardware bugs in most of the steppings).
 Support for up to 8 DIMMS of DDR4-2400 memory.
 Transistors:
 Die size: 247mm
 i7-6800K has 28 PCI Express lanes; all others have 40

Skylake microarchitecture (6th generation)

"Skylake-S" (quad-core, 14 nm) 

 All models support: MMX, SSE, SSE2, SSE3, SSSE3, SSE4.1, SSE4.2, AVX, AVX2, FMA3, F16C, BMI1 (Bit Manipulation Instructions 1) and BMI2, Enhanced Intel SpeedStep Technology (EIST), Intel 64, XD bit (an NX bit implementation), Intel VT-x, Intel VT-d, Hyper-threading, Turbo Boost 2.0, AES-NI, Smart Cache, Intel Insider, Intel SGX, Intel MPX, Intel TSX-NI
 Embedded models also support: Intel vPro, Intel TXT.
 Transistors: 
 Die size: 122.4 mm
 PCI Express lanes: 16

"Skylake-H" (quad-core, 14 nm) 

 All models support: MMX, SSE, SSE2, SSE3, SSSE3, SSE4.1, SSE4.2, AVX, AVX2, FMA3, F16C, (BMI1)(Bit Manipulation Instructions1)+BMI2, Enhanced Intel SpeedStep Technology (EIST), Intel 64, XD bit (an NX bit implementation), Intel VT-x, Intel VT-d, Hyper-threading, Turbo Boost 2.0, AES-NI, Smart Cache, Intel Insider, Intel vPro, Intel TXT, Intel SGX, Intel MPX, Intel TSX-NI.
 Transistors: 
 Die size: 
 PCI Express lanes: 16

"Skylake-X" (14 nm) 

 All models support: MMX, SSE, SSE2, SSE3, SSSE3, SSE4.1, SSE4.2, AVX, AVX2, AVX-512, FMA3, SGX, MPX, Enhanced Intel SpeedStep Technology (EIST), Intel 64, XD bit (an NX bit implementation), Intel VT-x, Intel VT-d, Turbo Boost, Hyper-threading, AES-NI, Intel TSX-NI, Smart Cache.
 PCI Express lanes: 28 (78xx), 44 (98xx)

Kaby Lake microarchitecture (7th generation)

"Kaby Lake-S" (14 nm) 

 All models support: MMX, SSE, SSE2, SSE3, SSSE3, SSE4.1, SSE4.2, AVX, AVX2, FMA3, SGX, MPX, Enhanced Intel SpeedStep Technology (EIST), Intel 64, XD bit (an NX bit implementation), Intel VT-x, Intel VT-d, Turbo Boost, Hyper-threading, AES-NI, Intel TSX-NI, Intel vPro, Intel TXT, Smart Cache.
 Low power models also support configurable TDP (cTDP) down.
 K models do not support Intel vPro, Intel TXT.
 Die size: 126.15 mm
 PCI Express lanes: 16

"Kaby Lake-X" (14 nm) 

 All models support: MMX, SSE, SSE2, SSE3, SSSE3, SSE4.1, SSE4.2, AVX, AVX2, FMA3, SGX, MPX, Enhanced Intel SpeedStep Technology (EIST), Intel 64, XD bit (an NX bit implementation), Intel VT-x, Intel VT-d, Turbo Boost, Hyper-threading, AES-NI, Intel TSX-NI, Smart Cache.
 PCI Express lanes: 16

Coffee Lake microarchitecture (8th/9th generation)

"Coffee Lake-S" (14 nm) 

 All models support: MMX, SSE, SSE2, SSE3, SSSE3, SSE4.1, SSE4.2, AVX, AVX2, FMA3, SGX, MPX, Enhanced Intel SpeedStep Technology (EIST), Intel 64, XD bit (an NX bit implementation), Intel VT-x, Intel VT-d, Turbo Boost, Hyper-threading (8xxx only), AES-NI, Intel TSX-NI, Intel vPro (except 8086K), Intel TXT, Smart Cache.
 Die size: 151 mm (6 cores), 177 mm (8 cores)
 PCI Express lanes: 16

Comet Lake microarchitecture (10th generation)

"Comet Lake-S" (14 nm) 
 All models support: MMX, SSE, SSE2, SSE3, SSSE3, SSE4.1, SSE4.2, AVX, AVX2, FMA3, SGX, Enhanced Intel SpeedStep Technology (EIST), Intel 64, XD bit (an NX bit implementation), Intel VT-x, Intel VT-d, Turbo Boost 3.0, Hyper-threading, AES-NI, Smart Cache.
 All models support up to DDR4-2933 memory.
 Low power and K models also support configurable TDP (cTDP) down.
 Overclocking: Unlocked multiplier on K and KF models.

Cypress Cove microarchitecture (11th generation)

"Rocket Lake-S" (14 nm) 

 All models support: SSE4.1, SSE4.2, AVX, AVX2, AVX-512, FMA3, Enhanced Intel SpeedStep Technology (EIST), Intel 64, XD bit (an NX bit implementation), Intel VT-x, Intel VT-d, Hyper-threading, Turbo Boost 3.0, Intel TXT, AES-NI, Smart Cache, DL Boost.
 All models support up to DDR4-3200 memory, and 20 lanes of PCI Express 4.0.
 Low power and K models also support configurable TDP (cTDP) down.
 Overclocking: Unlocked multiplier on K and KF models.

Golden Cove + Gracemont microarchitecture (12th generation)

"Alder Lake-S" (Intel 7) 
 All models support: SSE4.1, SSE4.2, AVX, AVX2, FMA3, Enhanced Intel SpeedStep Technology (EIST), Intel 64, XD bit (an NX bit implementation), Intel VT-x, Intel VT-d, Hyper-threading, Turbo Boost 3.0 (2.0 for embedded), AES-NI, Smart Cache, Thread Director, DL Boost, GNA 3.0, and Optane memory.
 All models support up to DDR5-4800 or DDR4-3200 memory, and 16 lanes of PCI Express 5.0 + 4 lanes of PCIe 4.0.
 Overclocking: Unlocked multiplier on K and KF models.

Raptor Cove + Gracemont microarchitecture (13th generation)

"Raptor Lake-S" (Intel 7) 
 All models support: SSE4.1, SSE4.2, AVX, AVX2, FMA3, Enhanced Intel SpeedStep Technology (EIST), Intel 64, XD bit (an NX bit implementation), Intel VT-x, Intel VT-d, Hyper-threading, Turbo Boost 3.0, AES-NI, Smart Cache, Thread Director, DL Boost, and GNA 3.0.

 All models support up to DDR5-5600 or DDR4-3200 memory, and 16 lanes of PCI Express 5.0 + 4 lanes of PCIe 4.0.
 Overclocking: Unlocked multiplier on K and KF models.

Mobile processors

Nehalem microarchitecture (1st generation)

"Clarksfield" (45 nm) 

 All models support: MMX, SSE, SSE2, SSE3, SSSE3, SSE4.1, SSE4.2, Enhanced Intel SpeedStep Technology (EIST), Intel 64, XD bit (an NX bit implementation), TXT, Intel VT-x, Intel VT-d, Hyper-threading, Turbo Boost, Smart Cache.
 FSB has been replaced with DMI.
 Transistors: 774 million
 Die size: 296 mm
 Steppings: B1
XM models feature an unlocked multiplier, allowing them to be overclocked.

Westmere microarchitecture (1st generation)

"Arrandale" (MCP, 32 nm) 

 All models support: MMX, SSE, SSE2, SSE3, SSSE3, SSE4.1, SSE4.2, Enhanced Intel SpeedStep Technology (EIST), Intel 64, XD bit (an NX bit implementation), TXT, Intel VT-x, Intel VT-d, Hyper-threading, Turbo Boost, AES-NI, Smart Cache.
 FSB has been replaced with DMI.
 Contains 45 nm "Ironlake" GPU.
 CPU Transistors: 382 million
 CPU die size: 81 mm
 Graphics and Integrated Memory Controller transistors: 177 million
 Graphics and integrated memory controller die size: 114 mm
 Steppings: C2, K0
 Core i7-610E, i7-620UE, i7-620LE and i7-660UE have support for ECC memory and PCI express port bifurcation.

Sandy Bridge microarchitecture (2nd generation)

"Sandy Bridge (dual-core)" (32 nm) 

 All models support: MMX, SSE, SSE2, SSE3, SSSE3, SSE4.1, SSE4.2, AVX, Enhanced Intel SpeedStep Technology (EIST), Intel 64, XD bit (an NX bit implementation), TXT, Intel VT-x, Intel VT-d, Hyper-threading, Turbo Boost, AES-NI, Smart Cache.
 Core i7-2620M, Core i7-2640M, Core i7-2637M, and Core i7-2677M support Intel Insider
 Core i7-2610UE, Core i7-2655LE does not support XD bit (Execute Disable bit).
 Core i7-2610UE, Core i7-2655LE has support for ECC memory
 Transistors: 624 million
 Die size: 149 mm

"Sandy Bridge (quad-core)" (32 nm) 

 All models support: MMX, SSE, SSE2, SSE3, SSSE3, SSE4.1, SSE4.2, AVX, Enhanced Intel SpeedStep Technology (EIST), Intel 64, XD bit (an NX bit implementation), TXT, Intel VT-x, Intel VT-d, Hyper-threading, Turbo Boost, AES-NI, Smart Cache, Intel Insider.
 Core i7-2630QM, Core i7-2635QM, Core i7-2670QM, Core i7-2675QM do not support TXT and Intel VT-d.
 Core i7-2715QE has support for ECC memory.
 Core i7-2710QE, Core i7-2715QE do not support Intel Insider and XD bit.(Execute Disable bit).
 Transistors: 1.16 billion
 Die size: 216 mm
XM models feature an unlocked multiplier, allowing them to be overclocked.

Ivy Bridge microarchitecture (3rd generation)

"Ivy Bridge (dual-core)" (22 nm) 

 All models support: MMX, SSE, SSE2, SSE3, SSSE3, SSE4.1, SSE4.2, AVX, F16C, Enhanced Intel SpeedStep Technology (EIST), Intel 64, XD bit (an NX bit implementation), TXT, Intel VT-x, Intel VT-d, Hyper-threading, Turbo Boost2.0, AES-NI, Smart Cache, Intel Insider.
 Core i7-3517U and i7-3537U do not support Intel TXT.
 Core i7-3555LE and Core i7-3517UE do not support Intel Insider.

"Ivy Bridge (quad-core)" (22 nm) 

 All models support: MMX, SSE, SSE2, SSE3, SSSE3, SSE4.1, SSE4.2, AVX, F16C, Enhanced Intel SpeedStep Technology (EIST), Intel 64, XD bit (an NX bit implementation), TXT, Intel VT-x, Intel VT-d, Hyper-threading, Turbo Boost, AES-NI, Smart Cache, Intel Insider.
 Core i7-3610QM, Core i7-3612QM and Core i7-3630QM (Socket G2) do not support Intel VT-d.
 Core i7-3610QE, Core i7-3615QE and Core i7-3612QE do not support Intel Insider.
 Transistors: 1.4 billion
 Die size: 160 mm
XM models feature an unlocked multiplier, allowing them to be overclocked.

Haswell microarchitecture (4th generation)

"Haswell-MB" (dual-core, 22 nm) 

 All models support: MMX, SSE, SSE2, SSE3, SSSE3, SSE4.1, SSE4.2, AVX, AVX2, FMA3, Enhanced Intel SpeedStep Technology (EIST), Intel 64, XD bit (an NX bit implementation), Intel TXT, Intel VT-x, Intel VT-d, Hyper-threading, Turbo Boost, AES-NI, Intel vPro,  Smart Cache
 Transistors: 1.3 billion
 Die size: 181 mm

"Haswell-ULT" (SiP, dual-core, 22 nm) 

 All models support: MMX, SSE, SSE2, SSE3, SSSE3, SSE4.1, SSE4.2, AVX, AVX2, FMA3, Enhanced Intel SpeedStep Technology (EIST), Intel 64, XD bit (an NX bit implementation), Intel VT-x, Hyper-threading, Turbo Boost, AES-NI, Smart Cache
 Core i7-4550U and higher also support Intel VT-d
 Core i7-4600U and i7-4650U also support Intel vPro and Intel TXT
 Transistors: 1.3 billion
 Die size: 181 mm

"Haswell-ULX" (SiP, dual-core, 22 nm) 
 All models support: MMX, SSE, SSE2, SSE3, SSSE3, SSE4.1, SSE4.2, AVX, AVX2, FMA3, Enhanced Intel SpeedStep Technology (EIST), Intel 64, XD bit (an NX bit implementation), Intel VT-x, Hyper-threading, Turbo Boost, AES-NI, Smart Cache, Intel VT-d, Intel vPro and Intel TXT
 Transistors: 1.3 billion
 Die size: 181 mm

"Haswell-MB" (quad-core, 22 nm) 

 All models support: MMX, SSE, SSE2, SSE3, SSSE3, SSE4.1, SSE4.2, AVX, AVX2, F16C, FMA3, Enhanced Intel SpeedStep Technology (EIST), Intel 64, XD bit (an NX bit implementation), Intel VT-x, Hyper-threading, Turbo Boost, AES-NI, Smart Cache, and Intel Insider
 Core i7-48xxMQ, i7-49xxMQ, and all MX models also support Intel TXT, Intel VT-d, and vPro.
 Transistors: 1.4 billion
 Die size: 177 mm
MX models feature an unlocked multiplier, allowing them to be overclocked.

"Haswell-H" (MCP, quad-core, 22 nm) 

 All models support: MMX, SSE, SSE2, SSE3, SSSE3, SSE4.1, SSE4.2, AVX, AVX2, FMA3, F16C, Enhanced Intel SpeedStep Technology (EIST), Intel 64, XD bit (an NX bit implementation), Intel VT-x, Intel VT-d, Intel TXT, Hyper-threading, Turbo Boost, AES-NI, Smart Cache, Intel Insider.
 Core i7-48xxHQ, i7-49xxHQ, and all EQ models also support Intel vPro and Intel TSX-NI
 Models with Iris Pro Graphics 5200 also contain "Crystalwell": 128 MB eDRAM built at (22 nm) acting as L4 cache
 Overclocking: i7-4950HQ comes with an unlocked multiplier, allowing users to set the multiplier value higher than shipped value, to facilitate better overclocking.
 EQ models support ECC memory
 Transistors: 
 Die size: 264 mm + 84 mm

Broadwell microarchitecture (5th generation)

"Broadwell-H" (MCP, quad-core, 14 nm) 

 All models support: MMX, SSE, SSE2, SSE3, SSSE3, SSE4.1, SSE4.2, AVX, AVX2, FMA3, F16C, Enhanced Intel SpeedStep Technology (EIST), Intel 64, XD bit (an NX bit implementation), Intel VT-x, Intel VT-d, Intel TXT, Hyper-threading, Turbo Boost, AES-NI, Smart Cache, Intel Insider, and configurable TDP (cTDP) down (47W→37W).
 Models with Iris Pro Graphics 6200 also contain "Crystalwell": 128 MB eDRAM acting as L4 cache
 EQ models also support Intel vPro, Intel TSX-NI, and ECC memory.
 Transistors: 
 Die size:

"Broadwell-U" (dual-core, 14 nm) 
 All models support: MMX, SSE, SSE2, SSE3, SSSE3, SSE4.1, SSE4.2, AVX, AVX2, FMA3, Enhanced Intel SpeedStep Technology (EIST), Intel 64, XD bit (an NX bit implementation), Intel VT-x, Intel VT-d, Hyper-threading, Turbo Boost, AES-NI, Smart Cache, configurable TDP (cTDP) down
 Core i7-5600U and higher also support Intel vPro, Intel TXT, and Intel TSX-NI
 Transistors: 1.3–1.9 billion
 Die size: 82–133 mm

Skylake microarchitecture (6th generation)

"Skylake-H" (MCP, quad-core, 14 nm) 

 All models support: MMX, SSE, SSE2, SSE3, SSSE3, SSE4.1, SSE4.2, AVX, AVX2, FMA3, F16C, Enhanced Intel SpeedStep Technology (EIST), Intel 64, XD bit (an NX bit implementation), Intel VT-x, Intel VT-d, Hyper-threading, Turbo Boost, AES-NI, Smart Cache, Intel Insider, and configurable TDP (cTDP) down (45W→35W).
 Core i7-6820HQ, Core i7-6920HQ, and embedded models also support Intel vPro, Intel TXT.
 Core i7-6820HK, Core i7-6820HQ, Core i7-6920HQ, and embedded models also support Intel TSX-NI.
 Core i7-6820HK features an unlocked multiplier, allowing it to be overclocked.
 Transistors: 
 Die size: 122 mm

"Skylake-U" (dual-core, 14 nm) 
 All models support: MMX, SSE, SSE2, SSE3, SSSE3, SSE4.1, SSE4.2, AVX, AVX2, FMA3, Enhanced Intel SpeedStep Technology (EIST), Intel 64, XD bit (an NX bit implementation), Intel VT-x, Intel VT-d, Hyper-threading, Turbo Boost, AES-NI, Smart Cache, Intel TSX-NI, and configurable TDP (cTDP) down
 Core i7-6600U and higher also support Intel vPro, Intel TXT.
 Transistors: 
 Die size:

Kaby Lake microarchitecture (7th/8th generation)

"Kaby Lake-H" (quad-core, 14 nm) 
 All models support: MMX, SSE, SSE2, SSE3, SSSE3, SSE4.1, SSE4.2, AVX, AVX2, FMA3, SGX, MPX, Enhanced Intel SpeedStep Technology (EIST), Intel 64, XD bit (an NX bit implementation), Intel VT-x, Intel VT-d, Turbo Boost, Hyper-threading, AES-NI, Smart Cache, configurable TDP (cTDP) down.
 i7-7800 and up also support Intel TSX-NI
 i7-7820HQ, i7-7920HQ and embedded models also support Intel vPro, Intel TXT.
i7-7820HK features an unlocked multiplier, allowing it to be overclocked.
 Transistors: TBD
 Die size:
 Embedded models support ECC memory

"Kaby Lake-U" (dual-core, 14 nm) 
 All models support: MMX, SSE, SSE2, SSE3, SSSE3, SSE4.1, SSE4.2, AVX, AVX2, FMA3, SGX, MPX, Enhanced Intel SpeedStep Technology (EIST), Intel 64, XD bit (an NX bit implementation), Intel VT-x, Intel VT-d, Turbo Boost, Hyper-threading, AES-NI, Smart Cache, and configurable TDP (cTDP).

"Kaby Lake-Y" (dual-core, 14 nm) 
 All models support: MMX, SSE, SSE2, SSE3, SSSE3, SSE4.1, SSE4.2, AVX, AVX2, FMA3, SGX, MPX, Enhanced Intel SpeedStep Technology (EIST), Intel 64, XD bit (an NX bit implementation), Intel VT-x, Intel VT-d, Turbo Boost, Hyper-threading, AES-NI, Smart Cache, Intel TSX-NI, Intel vPro, Intel TXT, and configurable TDP (cTDP).

"Kaby Lake Refresh" (quad-core, 14 nm)

"Kaby Lake-G" (quad-core, 14 nm)

"Amber Lake-Y" (dual-core, 14 nm)

Coffee Lake microarchitecture (8th/9th generation)

"Coffee Lake-U" (quad-core, 14 nm)

"Coffee Lake-H" (hexa-core, 14 nm)

"Coffee Lake-B" (hexa-core, 14 nm)

"Whiskey Lake-U" (quad-core, 14 nm)

"Amber Lake-Y" (quad-core, 14 nm)

Comet Lake microarchitecture (10th generation)

"Comet Lake-H" (14 nm)

"Comet Lake-U" (14 nm) 
 i7-10610U, 10810U also support Intel vPro.

Sunny Cove microarchitecture (10th generation)

"Ice Lake-U" (quad-core, 10 nm) 
 All models support: MMX, SSE, SSE2, SSE3, SSSE3, SSE4.1, SSE4.2, AVX, AVX2, AVX-512, FMA3, SGX, Enhanced Intel SpeedStep Technology (EIST), Intel 64, XD bit (an NX bit implementation), Intel VT-x, Intel VT-d, Turbo Boost, Hyper-threading, AES-NI, Smart Cache, DL Boost, and configurable TDP (cTDP).

"Ice Lake-Y" (quad-core, 10 nm) 
 All models support: MMX, SSE, SSE2, SSE3, SSSE3, SSE4.1, SSE4.2, AVX, AVX2, AVX-512, FMA3, SGX, Enhanced Intel SpeedStep Technology (EIST), Intel 64, XD bit (an NX bit implementation), Intel VT-x, Intel VT-d, Turbo Boost, Hyper-threading, AES-NI, Smart Cache, DL Boost, and configurable TDP (cTDP).

Willow Cove microarchitecture (11th generation)

"Tiger Lake-H" (10 nm SuperFin) 
 All models support: SSE4.1, SSE4.2, AVX2, AVX-512, FMA3, Speed Shift Technology (SST), Intel 64, Intel VT-x, Intel VT-d, Turbo Boost, Hyper-threading, AES-NI, Smart Cache, DL Boost, Optane memory, GNA 2.0, IPU6, TB4, and configurable TDP (cTDP).
 11850H also supports Intel vPro, Intel TXT.

"Tiger Lake-B" (10 nm SuperFin)

"Tiger Lake-H35" (10 nm SuperFin) 
 All models support: SSE4.1, SSE4.2, AVX2, AVX-512, FMA3, Speed Shift Technology (SST), Intel 64, Intel VT-x, Intel VT-d, Turbo Boost, Hyper-threading, AES-NI, Smart Cache, DL Boost, Optane memory, GNA 2.0, IPU6, TB4, and configurable TDP (cTDP).

"Tiger Lake-UP3" (10 nm SuperFin) 
 All models support: SSE4.1, SSE4.2, AVX2, AVX-512, FMA3, Speed Shift Technology (SST), Intel 64, Intel VT-x, Intel VT-d, Turbo Boost, Hyper-threading, AES-NI, Smart Cache, DL Boost, Optane memory, GNA 2.0, IPU6 (except SRK02), TB4, and configurable TDP (cTDP).
 1185G7, 1185G7E and 1185GRE also support Intel vPro, Intel TXT.
 -RE models support ECC memory.

"Tiger Lake-UP4" (10 nm SuperFin) 
 All models support: SSE4.1, SSE4.2, AVX2, AVX-512, FMA3, Speed Shift Technology (SST), Intel 64, Intel VT-x, Intel VT-d, Turbo Boost, Hyper-threading, AES-NI, Smart Cache, DL Boost, Optane memory, GNA 2.0, IPU6, TB4, and configurable TDP (cTDP).
 1180 also supports Intel vPro, Intel TXT.

Golden Cove + Gracemont microarchitecture (12th generation)

"Alder Lake-HX" (Intel 7) 
 All models support: SSE4.1, SSE4.2, AVX, AVX2, FMA3, Speed Shift Technology (SST), Intel 64, XD bit (an NX bit implementation), Intel VT-x, Intel VT-d, Hyper-threading, Turbo Boost 3.0, AES-NI, Smart Cache, Thread Director, DL Boost, and GNA 3.0.
 All models support up to DDR5-4800 or DDR4-3200 memory, and 20 lanes of PCI Express 5.0/4.0.
 12850HX also supports Intel vPro, Intel TXT

"Alder Lake-H" (Intel 7) 
 All models support: SSE4.1, SSE4.2, AVX, AVX2, FMA3, Speed Shift Technology (SST), Intel 64, XD bit (an NX bit implementation), Intel VT-x, Intel VT-d, Hyper-threading, Turbo Boost 3.0, AES-NI, Smart Cache, Thread Director, DL Boost, and GNA 3.0.
 All models support up to DDR5-4800, LPDDR5-5200, DDR4-3200, or LPDDR4X-4266 memory, and 28 lanes of PCI Express 4.0/3.0.

"Alder Lake-P" (Intel 7) 
 All models support: SSE4.1, SSE4.2, AVX, AVX2, FMA3, Speed Shift Technology (SST), Intel 64, XD bit (an NX bit implementation), Intel VT-x, Intel VT-d, Hyper-threading, Turbo Boost, AES-NI, IPU6, TB4, Smart Cache, Thread Director, DL Boost, and GNA 3.0.
 All models support up to DDR5-4800, LPDDR5-5200, DDR4-3200, or LPDDR4X-4266 memory, and 20 lanes of PCI Express 4.0/3.0.
 Model numbers 1270 and higher also support Intel vPro and Intel TXT.

"Alder Lake-U" (Intel 7) 
 All models support: SSE4.1, SSE4.2, AVX, AVX2, FMA3, Speed Shift Technology (SST), Intel 64, XD bit (an NX bit implementation), Intel VT-x, Intel VT-d, Hyper-threading, Turbo Boost, AES-NI, IPU6 (except SRLFR), TB4, Smart Cache, Thread Director, DL Boost, and GNA 3.0.
 Support 20 lanes (UP3) or 14 lanes (UP4) of PCI Express 4.0/3.0.
 All models support up to LPDDR5-5200 or LPDDR4X-4266 memory
 Standard power models also support up to DDR5-4800 or DDR4-3200 memory.
 Model numbers 1260 and higher also support Intel vPro and Intel TXT.

"Alder Lake-PS" (Intel 7) 
While sharing the same socket as Alder Lake-S and Raptor Lake-S, this revision of LGA 1700 is electrically incompatible with other 12th and 13th generation Intel Core desktop processors.

Raptor Cove + Gracemont microarchitecture (13th generation)

"Raptor Lake-HX" (Intel 7) 
 All models support: SSE4.1, SSE4.2, AVX, AVX2, FMA3, Speed Shift Technology (SST), Intel 64, XD bit (an NX bit implementation), Intel VT-x, Intel VT-d, Hyper-threading, Turbo Boost 3.0, AES-NI, Smart Cache, Thread Director, DL Boost, and GNA 3.0.
 All models support up to DDR5-4800 or DDR4-3200 memory, and 20 lanes of PCI Express 5.0/4.0.
 All models support CPU, GPU, and memory overclocking.
 13850HX also supports Intel vPro and ECC memory.

"Raptor Lake-H" (Intel 7) 
All models support: SSE4.1, SSE4.2, AVX, AVX2, FMA3, Speed Shift Technology (SST), Intel 64, XD bit (an NX bit implementation), Intel VT-x, Intel VT-d, Hyper-threading, Turbo Boost 3.0, AES-NI, IPU6, Smart Cache, Thread Director, DL Boost, and GNA 3.0.
 All models support up to DDR5-5200, LPDDR5-6400, DDR4-3200, or LPDDR4X-4266 memory, and up to 28 lanes of PCI Express 5.0/4.0.

"Raptor Lake-PX" (Intel 7) 
 All models support: SSE4.1, SSE4.2, AVX, AVX2, FMA3, Speed Shift Technology (SST), Intel 64, XD bit (an NX bit implementation), Intel VT-x, Intel VT-d, Hyper-threading, Turbo Boost 3.0, AES-NI, IPU6, Smart Cache, Thread Director, DL Boost, and GNA 3.0.
 All models support up to DDR5-5200, LPDDR5-6400, DDR4-3200, or LPDDR4X-4266 memory, and up to 28 lanes of PCI Express 5.0/4.0.

"Raptor Lake-P" (Intel 7) 
 All models support: SSE4.1, SSE4.2, AVX, AVX2, FMA3, Speed Shift Technology (SST), Intel 64, XD bit (an NX bit implementation), Intel VT-x, Intel VT-d, Hyper-threading, Turbo Boost, AES-NI, IPU6, TB4, Smart Cache, Thread Director, DL Boost, and GNA 3.0.
 All models support up to DDR5-5200, LPDDR5-6400, DDR4-3200, or LPDDR4X-4266 memory, and 20 lanes of PCI Express 4.0/3.0.
 1370P, 1360P and 1370PE also support Intel vPro and Intel TXT.

"Raptor Lake-U" (Intel 7) 
 All models support: SSE4.1, SSE4.2, AVX, AVX2, FMA3, Speed Shift Technology (SST), Intel 64, XD bit (an NX bit implementation), Intel VT-x, Intel VT-d, Hyper-threading, Turbo Boost, AES-NI, IPU6, TB4, Smart Cache, Thread Director, DL Boost, and GNA 3.0.
 All models support up to DDR5-5200, LPDDR5-6400, DDR4-3200, or LPDDR4X-4266 memory, and 20 lanes of PCI Express 4.0/3.0.
 1365U, 1365UE and 1355U also support Intel vPro and Intel TXT.

See also
 Intel Core
 Comparison of Intel processors
 List of Intel Celeron microprocessors
 List of Intel Pentium microprocessors
 List of Intel Core i3 microprocessors
 List of Intel Core i5 microprocessors
 List of Intel Core i9 microprocessors

Notes

References

External links
 Intel Core i7 desktop processor product order code table
 Intel Core i7 mobile processor product order code table
 Intel Core i7 desktop processor Extreme Edition product order code table
 Intel Core i7 mobile processor Extreme Edition product order code table
 Search MDDS Database
 Intel ARK Database
 Intel's Core i7 web page
 Intel's Core i7 Extreme Edition web page
 Intel's Core i7 Processor Numbers
 Intel's Core i7 Extreme Edition Processor Numbers
 Intel Corporation – Processor Price List
 Intel CPU Transition Roadmap 2008–2013
 Intel Desktop CPU Roadmap 2004–2011

Core i7
Intel Core i7